Sebastian Bea (born April 10, 1977, in San Francisco, California) is an American rower. He won a silver medal in the men's pair at the 2000 Summer Olympics in Sydney, Australia, along with Ted Murphy, and is a 1999 graduate of the University of California, Berkeley.

He is the son of federal judge Carlos Bea.

References

External links 
 
 
 

1977 births
Living people
Rowers from San Francisco
Rowers at the 2000 Summer Olympics
Rowers at the 2007 Pan American Games
Olympic silver medalists for the United States in rowing
American male rowers
World Rowing Championships medalists for the United States
Medalists at the 2000 Summer Olympics
Pan American Games medalists in rowing
Pan American Games gold medalists for the United States
Pan American Games silver medalists for the United States
Medalists at the 2007 Pan American Games